Lodestone Games was a game development studio based in Charlottesville, Virginia. The majority of its employees came from EA/Kesmai after Electronic Arts closed that studio in the fall of 2001. Lodestone Games specialised in the development of both online PC games and client/server technology for online PC games.

History
The company's first project was a futuristic car combat game titled, Driving Force. Before the game could be finished Sony Online Entertainment halted the production and re-tasked Lodestone to develop network hosting technology as well as a real-time weather system for the massively multiplayer online game PlanetSide. After PlanetSide shipped, Sony Online Entertainment contracted with Lodestone to create a third person fantasy role playing game, named Soul Forge.

Due to a budgetary shortfall Sony canceled the production of Soul Forge. Unlike the cancellation of Driving Force Sony Online Entertainment had no other work to give to Lodestone. As a result of this Lodestone Games was forced to lay off all employees and cease operations at the end of October, 2003. The majority of Lodestone's employees went on to work at Mythic Entertainment. Others ended up at Sony Online Entertainment, Volition, and Obsidian Entertainment.

Games developed by Lodestone Games
 Driving Force (Unreleased)
 PlanetSide
 Soul Forge (Unreleased)

Staff
 Lorin Jameson, President and Technical Director, now at Sony Online
 Matt Shaw, Lead Engineer, now Chief Technical Officer of Amazon Lumberyard
 Jeff Hanna, Art Director, now at Volition
 Chris DeBaun, Production Manager
 Colin Shannon, Engineer, now at EA Mythic
 Ed Teffeau, Engineer, now at ZeniMax Online Studios
 Kyle Forbes, Engineer, now at Sony Online
 Paul Suggs, Engineer, now at VGT
 Robert Haschart, Engineer
 Greg Grimsby, Lead Artist, now at EA Mythic
 Brian Traficante, Artist, now at Volition
 Chris Woodum, Artist
 Jeremy Dale, Artist, now at EA Mythic
 Steve Marvin, Designer, now at Tencent Boston
 Nick Laiacona, Designer
 Frank Coker, Designer

Video game companies established in 2001
Video game companies disestablished in 2003
Defunct video game companies of the United States
Companies based in Virginia